Personalidad: 20 Éxitos is title of a compilation album by Mexican singer-songwriter Ana Gabriel. It was released in 1992 by Sony Music. It was also repackaged as The Best for the United States, where it peaked at number two in the Billboard Latin Pop Albums chart and received a multiplatinum certification by the Recording Industry Association of America for sales over 200,000 units.

Track listing

Chart performance

The Best

Personalidad: 20 Exitos

Certifications

References 

1992 greatest hits albums
Ana Gabriel compilation albums